Peter John Smith (born 12 July 1969) was an English professional footballer who made 140 Football League appearances playing as a right back for Brighton & Hove Albion.

Life and career
Smith was born in Cannock, Staffordshire. He played non-league football for a string of clubs in that area, worked in the building trade and in social work, and was studying at the University of Greenwich when Brighton & Hove Albion offered him professional terms in 1994. He stayed with the club for five years and made 140 league appearances before spending several years back in non-league in the London area.

In 2007, Smith and Jamie Moralee co-founded a player agency where, both were still involved.

References

1969 births
Living people
People from Cannock
English footballers
Association football fullbacks
Lichfield City F.C. players
Tamworth F.C. players
Alvechurch F.C. players
Bromsgrove Rovers F.C. players
Willenhall F.C. players
Banbury United F.C. players
Alma Swanley F.C. players
Brighton & Hove Albion F.C. players
Woking F.C. players
Canvey Island F.C. players
Grays Athletic F.C. players
Chelmsford City F.C. players
Staines Town F.C. players
English Football League players
National League (English football) players
Isthmian League players
Black British sportsmen
Association football agents
British sports agents